The F.J. Lauerman House also known as Casa de las Floras is house located in Marinette, Wisconsin. It was added to the National Register of Historic Places on August 14, 1979.

History
The house was originally built for F.J. Lauerman, a prominent member of Marinette, who originally was from Muscoda. Lauerman promised his wife to be allowed to design their house. She liked the design of the William Borden house that appeared in a 1900 issue of the Ladies' Home Journal. That house had been designed by L.B. Valk, an architect from Los Angeles. After inquiring to Valk, Mrs. Lauerman was able to get a house designed and built for around $20,000. The house was of exotic design to the area and unmatched in the Wisconsin landscape at the time. The house was completed in 1901. Mrs. Lauerman only lived there for two years after its completion. Mr. Lauerman continued to live in the house until his death in 1959. The house still remains with his family.

References

National Register of Historic Places in Marinette County, Wisconsin